Teddy Pierre-Marie Riner (born 7 April 1989) is a French judoka. He has won ten World Championships gold medals, the first and only judoka (male or female) to do so, and three Olympic gold medals (two individual, one team). He has also won five gold medals at the European Championships. He was a member of the Levallois Sporting Club before joining Paris Saint-Germain in August 2017.

Personal life
Riner was born on 7 April 1989 in Les Abymes near Pointe-à-Pitre, in Guadeloupe, an insular region of France in the Caribbean. He was raised in Paris. He was enrolled at a local sports club by his parents and played football, tennis and basketball, but says he preferred judo "because it is an individual sport and it's me, only me."

He is nicknamed "Teddy Bear", or "Big Ted".

Judo career
Riner was a member of the Levallois Sporting Club in Levallois-Perret, France and is coached by Christian Chaumont and Benoît Campargue. He won the World and European junior titles in 2006. In 2007, he won a gold medal at the European Judo Championships in Belgrade, Serbia, on the day after his eighteenth birthday. At the 2007 World Judo Championships in Rio de Janeiro, Brazil, he became the youngest ever senior world champion when he won the heavyweight (+100 kg) event, defeating the 2000 Olympic gold medallist, Kosei Inoue of Japan, in the semi-final.

At the 2008 Summer Olympics in Beijing, China, Riner competed in the men's heavyweight event. He received a bye into the second round of the competition before beating Anis Chedli of Tunisia and Kazakhstan's Yeldos Ikhsangaliyev to advance to the semi-finals. In the semis he was beaten by Uzbek judoka Abdullo Tangriev on the golden score, meaning Riner had to enter the repechage rounds. In the repechage he defeated Andreas Tölzer and João Schlittler to reach a bronze medal final against Lasha Gujejiani of Georgia; Riner took the bronze medal by a score of one ippon, one yuko and one koka to nil. In December 2008 he won his second World Championship gold medal at the Open weight Championships held in Levallois-Perret, France, by beating Alexander Mikhaylin of Russia in the final.

Riner won his third world title at the 2009 World Championships in Rotterdam, the Netherlands. He won bouts against Daniel McCormick, Vladimirs Osnachs, Ivan Iliev and Martin Padar in the pool stage before beating Marius Paškevičius in the semi-finals and Oscar Bryson in the final to take the gold medal.

In 2010, he won two medals, a gold and a silver, at the World Championships in Tokyo. After winning the +100 competition Riner was defeated by Daiki Kamikawa of Japan in the final of open weight class by a 2–1 judge's decision. After the bout, Riner refused to bow or to shake Kamikawa's hand, claiming that he "was robbed".

Riner won his second European gold medal at the 2011 Championships in Istanbul, Turkey. He defeated Nodor Metreveli, Emil Tahirov and Zohar Asaf to win Pool A of the +100 kg competition before defeating Estonian Martin Padar in the semi-finals and Barna Bor of Hungary in the final to win the title. At the 2011 World Judo Championships in Paris Riner won the gold medal in men's +100 kg division, beating Germany's Tölzer in the final. The result meant that Riner became the first ever male Judoka to win five world titles. He won his sixth World Championship gold medal as part of the French side that won the team event.

Riner was selected to compete for France at the 2012 Summer Olympics in London, England in the men's heavyweight event. The event took place at ExCeL London on 3 August. Riner won the gold medal by defeating Russia's Alexander Mikhaylin in the final.

At the 2016 Olympics, he defended his Olympics heavyweight title, defeating Hisayoshi Harasawa in the final.

In his career, Riner was only defeated nine times in elite international championships.  He lost to Brayson and Tölzer in 2006, to Bianchessi and Rybak in 2007 and to Muneta and Grim Vuijsters in 2008.  He lost to Abdullo Tangriev in the third round of the 2008 Summer Olympics, before obtaining the bronze medal, and on 13 September 2010 he lost the openweight title at the 2010 World Judo Championships in Tokyo to Daiki Kamikawa, his last defeat before a series of 154 victories. After almost 10 years, he lost in the third round of the Paris Grand Slam against world number 2 Kokoro Kageura.

In 2021, he won the gold medal in his event at the 2021 Judo World Masters held in Doha, Qatar.

At the 2020 Tokyo Olympics, Riner achieved a bronze medal in the over 100-kilogram class following a defeat by Russian judoka Tamerlan Bashaev. He also won the gold medal in the mixed team event.

Awards
2016 Officier de l'ordre national du Mérite
2011 RTL Champion of Champions – This annual sports award was inaugurated in 2008 and is awarded by RTL, a French commercial radio network. The previous winners were Alain Bernard (2008), Sébastien Loeb (2009) and Christophe Lemaitre (2010).
2012 L'Équipe Champion of Champions (France male category)
2013 Chevalier de la Légion d'honneur

References

External links

 
 
 
 
 

1989 births
Knights of the Ordre national du Mérite
French male judoka
French people of Guadeloupean descent
Guadeloupean male judoka
Judoka at the 2008 Summer Olympics
Judoka at the 2012 Summer Olympics
Judoka at the 2016 Summer Olympics
Living people
Olympic bronze medalists for France
Olympic judoka of France
Olympic gold medalists for France
Olympic medalists in judo
World judo champions
Medalists at the 2016 Summer Olympics
Medalists at the 2012 Summer Olympics
Medalists at the 2008 Summer Olympics
European champions for France
Mediterranean Games gold medalists for France
Competitors at the 2009 Mediterranean Games
People from Les Abymes
Black French sportspeople
Mediterranean Games medalists in judo
Judoka at the 2020 Summer Olympics
Medalists at the 2020 Summer Olympics